The 1992 French Open was a tennis tournament that took place on the outdoor clay courts at the Stade Roland Garros in Paris, France. The tournament was held from 25 May until 7 June. It was the 96th staging of the French Open, and the second Grand Slam tennis event of 1992. This was the last time both the top seeds won the men's singles and women's singles until the 2018 French Open.

Seniors

Men's singles 

 Jim Courier defeated  Petr Korda, 7–5, 6–2, 6–1
• It was Courier's 3rd career Grand Slam singles title and his 2nd and last title at the French Open. It was Courier's 5th title of the year, and his 9th overall.

Women's singles 

 Monica Seles defeated  Steffi Graf, 6–2, 3–6, 10–8
• It was Seles' 6th career Grand Slam singles title and her 3rd and last title at the French Open. It was Monica's 6th title of the year, and her 26th overall.

Men's doubles 

  Jakob Hlasek /  Marc Rosset defeated  David Adams /  Andrei Olhovskiy, 7–6, 6–7, 7–5
• It was Hlasek's 1st and only career Grand Slam doubles title.
• It was Rosset's 1st and only career Grand Slam doubles title.

Women's doubles 

 Gigi Fernández /  Natalia Zvereva defeated  Conchita Martínez /  Arantxa Sánchez Vicario, 6–3, 6–2

Mixed doubles 

 Arantxa Sánchez Vicario /  Todd Woodbridge defeated  Lori McNeil /  Bryan Shelton, 6–2, 6–3
• It was Sánchez Vicario's 2nd career Grand Slam mixed doubles title and her 2nd and last title at the French Open.
• It was Woodbridge's 2nd career Grand Slam mixed doubles title and his 1st title at the French Open.

Juniors

Boys' singles 
 Andrei Pavel defeated  Mosé Navarra, 6–1, 3–6, 6–3

Girls' singles 
 Rossana de los Ríos defeated  Paola Suárez, 6–4, 6–0

Boys' doubles 
 Enrique Abaroa /  Grant Doyle

Girls' doubles 
 Laurence Courtois /  Nancy Feber

Prize money

Total prize money for the event was FF41,425,000.

References

External links
 French Open official website

 
1992 in French tennis
1992 in Paris